Fear Is the Mindkiller is a remix EP containing remixes of songs from the first album Soul of a New Machine by Fear Factory. It was released on April 14, 1993 by Roadrunner Records.

Content
Remixes 1-5 were remixed by Rhys Fulber and Bill Leeb of Front Line Assembly. The EP was remastered and re-released on October 5, 2004 in a digipak, packaged together with the remastered Soul of a New Machine without "Self Immolation". The title of the record is a quote from "Litany against fear", a fictional incantation from Dune, the science fiction novel written by Frank Herbert.

When playing live in the 1990s, the band would occasionally play a variation of the Deep Dub Trauma remix of "Scumgrief", rather than the original.

Track listing

Personnel

Fear Factory
 Burton C. Bell − vocals
 Dino Cazares − guitar
 Raymond Herrera − drums
 Andrew Shives – bass
 Raynor Diego – keyboards

Production 
 Rhys Fulber − digital adaptation
 Brian Gardner − mastering
 Bernie Grundman − mastering
 Karl Kotas − art direction, computer graphics
 Ron Obvious − facility consultant
 Greg Reely − sonic architect
 Colin Richardson − producer
 Ira Rosenson − photography
 Joel Van Dyke − sonic assistance

References

1993 EPs
Fear Factory EPs
1993 remix albums
Remix EPs
Roadrunner Records remix albums
Roadrunner Records EPs